The 2006–07 FIS Ski Jumping World Cup was the 28th World Cup season. It began in Kuusamo, Finland on 24 November 2006 and finished in Planica, Slovenia on 25 March 2007. Adam Małysz, Poland won the individual World Cup. e.on Ruhrgas was this season's main sponsor, and therefore, this season's leader's jersey was red, in reference to the company, rather than the traditional yellow.

Lower competitive circuits this season included the Continental Cup and Grand Prix.

Calendar

Men

Men's team

Individual World Cup 

The jumper highlighted in red was the leader of the World Cup  at the time of the competition and wore the red jersey.
The jumper highlighted in azure was the leader of the Nordic Tournament  at the time of the competition and wore the blue jersey.
The jumper highlighted in pink was the leader of the Four Hills Tournament at the time of the competition. This competition has no leader's jersey.

Kuusamo 

 K-120 Rukatunturi, Finland
November 24, 2006

Notes:
Jakub Janda wore the red jersey as the reigning champion.
Due to difficult weather conditions, the qualifying round was cancelled twice. Therefore, 67 jumpers participated in the first round.
 As the competition progressed, the weather worsened, and the jumpers with the high starting numbers faced conditions which German jumper Michael Uhrmann said gave "the best jumpers no chance". The jury decided to finish the first round to get a result, and the jumpers with the early start numbers ended up dominating the top of the result list. Arttu Lappi took his first World Cup win, and Anders Jacobsen took third place in his first ever World Cup event. 4 of the top 10 were from the national group, entering as extra competitors for the home nation, while the likes of Adam Małysz (34th), Andreas Küttel (41st), Jakub Janda (52nd), Janne Happonen (53rd), Janne Ahonen (55th) and Roar Ljøkelsøy (65th), all among the top 20 in last year's World Cup standings, would not have qualified for an eventual second round.

 K-120 Rukatunturi, Finland
November 25, 2006

Notes:
Shifting wind made it difficult for the jury to set a speed on the jump. The competition was restarted three times, before the jury finally decided to cancel it at 17.50 CET. Heavy fog, and 6–10 m/s wind on the jump made it impossible to continue the competition.

Trondheim/Lillehammer 
Notes:
The events was moved to Lillehammer due to warm weather and lack of snow in Trondheim., 

 K-120 Lysgårdsbakken, Norway
December 2, 2006
Notes:
Gregor Schlierenzauer set a new hill record, with his 140 meters in the qualifying run. He improved his own record in the 2nd run, with his 141 meter long jump.
World Cup leader Arttu Lappi fell in his first jump, and lost 21 points. Adam Małysz (first run) and Denis Kornilov (second run) also fell during the competition.
Anders Jacobsen jumped 142 meters, four metres over the official hill size, in the 2nd run, but fell.

 K-120 Lysgårdsbakken, Norway
December 3, 2006
Notes:
Adam Małysz set a new hill record in the qualifying run, with 142.0 meters.
Gregor Schlierenzauer became the fifth individual to win a Ski jumping World Cup-competition at the age of 16, or younger. The four others are Steve Collins (15), Toni Nieminen (16), Primož Peterka (16) and Thomas Morgenstern (16).

Harrachov 
 K-120 Čerťák, Czech Republic
Notes:

The competitions in Harrachov were cancelled due to warm temperatures and lack of snow.

Engelberg 

 K-125 Gross-Titlis-Schanze, Switzerland
December 16, 2006

Notes:

Gregor Schlierenzauer took his second win on a row, with his victory in Switzerland. Simon Ammann kept his World Cup lead, but is now only 30 points ahead of Schlierenzauer and 34 ahead of Anders Jacobsen who took his third podium of the season.
Several of the big names again struggled to find form. Last years World Cup-winner Jakub Janda only finished 14th, and Janne Ahonen ended up on a 21st place.

 K-125 Gross-Titlis-Schanze, Switzerland
December 17, 2006

Notes:
Anders Jacobsen took his first World Cup-win, and fourth podium in his career.
Simon Ammann kept his World Cup-lead, therefore, Switzerland will have four competitors in the Four Hills Tournament.

Four Hills Tournament

Oberstdorf 

 K-120 Schattenbergschanze, Germany
December 30, 2006
Notes:
Schlierenzauer had the longest jumps in both rounds, with the second round leap of 142 metres just 1.5 metres short of the hill record.
The top six in the overall World Cup standings were all in the top six of this event. 
Defending Four Hills champions Janne Ahonen and Jakub Janda finished seventh and 21st, respectively. Janda fell back 16 places from the event in Engelberg two weeks previously.

Garmisch-Partenkirchen 

 K-115 Große Olympiaschanze, Germany
January 1, 2007
Notes:
Gregor Schlierenzauer was the leader of both the World Cup, and the Four Hills Tournament before the competition.
Anders Jacobsen once again won the qualifying round, and jumped in the last duel against the reigning K-90 World Champion, Rok Benkovič from Slovenia.
Due to concerns over rain and wind, the second round was cancelled.
Noriaki Kasai, who failed to qualify for the first round, finished third after making the longest jump in the competition.
Thomas Morgenstern made the fourth longest jump, but nearly fell, and was docked style points to finish 11th.
Simon Ammann finished 17th and fell down to third place in the overall World Cup standings.
Küttel, who finished second in Oberstdorf, won the event and cut Schlierenzauer's lead in the overall Four Hills standings to three points.

Innsbruck 

 K-120 Bergiselschanze, Austria
January 4, 2007
Notes:
Gregor Schlierenzauer was the leader of both the World Cup, and the Four Hills Tournament before the competition.

Bischofshofen 

 K-125 Paul-Ausserleitner-Schanze, Austria
January 7, 2007
Notes:
Anders Jacobsen was the leader of both the World Cup, and the Four Hills Tournament before the competition.
Anders Jacobsen won the qualifying round for the third time in the tournament. He jumped in the last duel against the reigning Four Hills Tournament champion and his childhood hero, Janne Ahonen from Finland.

Vikersund 

 K-185 Vikersundbakken, Norway
January 13, 2007
Notes:
Gregor Schlierenzauer did not participate in Vikersund.
Only 42 jumpers, the smallest in any World Cup event thus far in the season, took part in the training session. However, 13 of the top 16 in the World Cup are participating, with only Austrians Schlierenzauer, Loitzl and Höllwarth skipping the meet.
Four Hills Tournament winner, Anders Jacobsen, set a new personal best in the training session, with his 202 meter long jump. This was his first jump over 200 meters. Janne Ahonen & Michael Uhrmann had the longest jump during the session with his 214.5 meter long jump.

 K-185 Vikersundbakken, Norway
January 14, 2007

Notes:
Due to the storms raging most of southern Norway, the competition was cancelled. The wind varied between 2–5 meters per second.

Zakopane 

 K-120 Wielka Krokiew, Poland
January 20, 2007

Notes:
Adam Małysz was in a league of his own in the practice run, with his 135 meter long jump. Robert Kranjec and Anders Bardal followed with 132 and 129 meters respectively. World Cup leader Anders Jacobsen had the shortest jump, reaching only 89 meters.
Strong wind made the jury cancel the 2nd round when 10 jumpers remained on the top. Urbanc won his first World Cup competition, while Roar Ljøkelsøy was back on the podium for the first time since March 18, 2006.
Czech jumper Jan Mazoch, 15th after the first round, took a terrible tumble and suffered a severe concussion. He was taken to a nearby hospital and put into an artificially induced coma.

 K-120 Wielka Krokiew, Poland
January 21, 2007
Notes:
The competition was cancelled due to strong wind.

Oberstdorf 
Notes:
The competitions were scheduled to be held in the K-185 hill, but due to lack of snow in Oberstdorf, the competitions will be held in the K-120 hill. 

 K-120 Schattenbergschanze, Germany
January 27, 2007

Notes:
The competition was delayed for 45 minutes due to snow.
For the first time in a two-round event since Lillehammer in December, neither Schlierenzauer nor Jacobsen made it to the podium.
Urbanc, the winner of the Zakopane event, failed to qualify.

 K-120 Schattenbergschanze, Germany
January 28, 2007

Titisee-Neustadt 

 K-125 Hochfirstschanze, Germany
February 3, 2007
Notes:
Both Martin Schmitt and Michael Uhrmann fell during the competition.
The Norwegian trio of Roar Ljøkelsøy (4th), Tom Hilde (8th) and Anders Bardal (15th), were all disqualified, after removing a strap on their start number. According to the Norwegians, the straps were too tight.

 K-125 Hochfirstschanze, Germany
February 4, 2007
Notes:
Adam Małysz took his 32nd World Cup win, and tied with Janne Ahonen on the third place on the all-time list.
Dimitry Vassiliev took his second podium.
Mario Innauer set a personal best.

Klingenthal 

 K-125 Vogtlandarena, Germany
February 7, 2007

Notes:
This is to replace the cancelled competitions in Harrachov, and is therefore organized by the Czech ski federation.
World Cup leader Anders Jacobsen did not participate.

Willingen 

 K-130 Mühlenkopfschanze, Germany
February 10, 2007

World Championships 

The 2007 FIS Nordic World Ski Championships took place between February 22 and March 4, 2007 in Sapporo, Japan. The competitions in the World Championships did not award the jumpers World Cup-points.

Nordic Tournament

Lahti

 K-116 Lahti, Finland
March 11, 2007

Kuopio

 K-120 Puijo, Finland
March 13, 2007

Lillehammer/Oslo

 K-115 Holmenkollen, Norway
March 17, 2007

Notes:
The event was moved from Lillehammer to Oslo

Oslo

 K-115 Holmenkollen, Norway
March 18, 2007

Planica

 K-185 Letalnica, Slovenia
March 23, 2007

 K-185 Letalnica, Slovenia
March 24, 2007

 K-185 Letalnica, Slovenia
March 25, 2007

Overall Top 15 

Key

 1: Kuusamo (24 November 2006)
 2: Lillehammer (2 December 2006)
 3: Lillehammer (3 December 2006)
 4: Engelberg (16 December 2006)
 5: Engelberg (17 December 2006)
 6: Oberstdorf (30 December 2006)
 7: Garmisch-Partenkirchen (1 January 2007)
 8: Innsbruck (4 January 2007)
 9: Bischofshofen (7 January 2007)
 10: Vikersund (13 January 2007)
 11: Zakopane (20 January 2007)
 12: Oberstdorf (27 January 2007)
 13: Oberstdorf (28 January 2007)
 14: Titisee-Neustadt (3 February 2007)
 15: Titisee-Neustadt (4 February 2007)
 16: Klingenthal (7 February 2007)
 17: Willingen (10 February 2007)
 18: Lahti (11 March 2007)
 19: Kuopio (13 March 2007)
 20: Oslo (17 March 2007)
 21: Oslo (18 March 2007)
 22: Planica (23 March 2007)
 23: Planica (24 March 2007)
 24: Planica (25 March 2007)

Team World Cup

Willingen
 K-130 Mühlenkopfschanze, Germany
February 10, 2007
Notes:
Slovenia, Poland and Japan did not participate.
Finland competed with a b-team.

Lahti
 K-116 Lahti, Finland
March 10, 2007

See also
 2007 in ski jumping

References
 World Cup standings, from fis-ski.com

Fis Ski Jumping World Cup, 2006-07
Fis Ski Jumping World Cup, 2006-07
FIS Ski Jumping World Cup